"I Love My Friend" is a 1974 single written by Billy Sherrill and Norro Wilson and recorded by Charlie Rich. "I Love My Friend" was Rich's sixth number one on the country chart. The single remained at number one for one week and spent a total of ten weeks on the chart. "I Love My Friend" peaked at number 24 on the Billboard Hot 100 and reached number one on the Easy Listening chart.

Chart performance

Cover Versions
Andy Williams included a version of the song in his album You Lay So Easy on My Mind (1974).

References

1974 singles
Charlie Rich songs
Andy Williams songs
Songs written by Billy Sherrill
Songs written by Norro Wilson
Song recordings produced by Billy Sherrill
Epic Records singles
1974 songs